The 1999 San Jose Clash season was the fourth season of the team's existence. The San Jose Clash were purchased and owned by the Kraft Group Sports on November 18, 1999. San Jose revamped their roster for the 1999 season adding an influx of youth utilizing the draft with Jamie Clark, Jimmy Conrad, Scott Bower, Caleb Porter, Maxi Viera, Carlos Farias and Anthony Farace. They also picked up Joe Cannon, Leighton O'Brien, Adam Frye and Joey Martinez. The team set an MLS best in shootouts with 11 wins in 1999.

Squad

Current squad

Competitions

Major League Soccer

Standings

Western Conference

Overall Table

Matches 

(SO) = Shootout
Source:

References

External links
San Jose Earthquakes season stats | sjearthquakes.com
San Jose Earthquakes Game Results | Soccerstats.us
San Jose Earthquakes 100 Greatest Goals 1999 | Youtube

1999
San Jose Clash
San Jose Clash
San Jose Clash